The 10,000 metres or the 10,000-metre run is a common long-distance track running event. The event is part of the athletics programme at the Olympic Games and the World Athletics Championships, and is common at championship level events. The race consists of 25 laps around an Olympic-sized track. It is less commonly held at track and field meetings, due to its duration. The 10,000-metre track race is usually distinguished from its road running counterpart, the 10K run, by its reference to the distance in metres rather than kilometres.

Most of those running such races also compete in road races and cross country events.

Added to the Olympic programme in 1912, athletes from Finland, nicknamed the "Flying Finns", dominated the event until the late 1940s. In the 1960s, African runners began to come to the fore. In 1988, the women's competition debuted in the Olympic Games.

Official records are kept for outdoor 10,000-metre track events. The world record for men is held by Joshua Cheptegei of Uganda in 26:11.00, posted at Valencia, Spain on 7 October 2020. For women, the world track 10,000-metre record is held by Letesenbet Gidey of Ethiopia in 29:01.03, posted at Hengelo, Netherlands on 8 June 2021.

The 10,000 metres demands exceptional levels of aerobic endurance, and elite athletes typically train in excess of 160 km (100 miles) a week.

6 miles
10,000 metres is the slightly longer metric derivative of the  run, an event common in countries when they were using the imperial measurement system. 6 miles was used in the Commonwealth Games until 1966 and was a championship in the United States in non-Olympic years from 1953 to 1973. It is 24 laps around a  track.

All-time top 25

Men

Correct .

Women
Correct .

Annulled marks
Elvan Abeylegesse of Turkey ran 29:56.34 at the 2008 Olympics. This performance was annulled due to doping offences.

Olympic medalists

Men

Women

World Championships medalists

Men

Women

European Championships medalists

Men

Women

Season's bests

Men

Women

Competitions
European Cup 10,000m
Iberian 10,000 Metres Championships

References

External links
IAAF list of 10000-metres records in XML
ARRS: Yearly Rankings - 10,000 meters Outdoor Track
10K Races in Race-Calendar.com 

 
Events in track and field
Long-distance running distances
Summer Olympic disciplines in athletics